Luis Enrique Méndez (born November 16, 1973) is a former world champion in Greco-Roman Wrestling competing for Cuba.

Méndez represented Cuba at the 2000 Olympics, as well as 5 World Championships. His greatest accomplishment was a gold medal at the 1999 World Wrestling Championships.

References

External links
 

1973 births
Living people
Wrestlers at the 2000 Summer Olympics
Cuban male sport wrestlers
Olympic wrestlers of Cuba
World Wrestling Championships medalists
Wrestlers at the 1999 Pan American Games
Wrestlers at the 2003 Pan American Games
Pan American Games gold medalists for Cuba
Pan American Games medalists in wrestling
Medalists at the 1999 Pan American Games